Luisa Naranjo (born 16 May 1997) is a Colombian professional racing cyclist. She won the Colombian National Road Race Championships in 2017.

References

External links
 
 

1997 births
Living people
Colombian female cyclists
Place of birth missing (living people)
20th-century Colombian women
21st-century Colombian women